Daniel Warren Hoffman  is an American-Israeli klezmer violinist, composer, and documentary film producer. He first heard klezmer music played on the piano by his father.

Hoffman is the founder of the klezmer-jazz fusion ensemble, the Klez-X  and co-founder of Davka  and Trio Carpion.  He also performs with Di Tsaytmashin, Harel Shachal and the Ottomans, and with Ute Lemper in Songs for Eternity. He is the producer of the documentary film, Otherwise It’s Just Firewood, the pilot film for a television series that will explore the role of the Italianate violin in disparate cultures worldwide. Otherwise It's Just Firewood was aired widely on American PBS stations in 2018.

His private, classical teachers include Daniel Kobialka, Raphael Bronstein and Ariana Bronne.  Daniel is a graduate of The Manhattan School of Music. He has also studied and performed Arabic, Turkish, Greek, and Balkan music. He grew up in La Habra, California and relocated to Tel Aviv, Israel in 2005.

As a composer, he has received composition grants from the National Endowment for the Arts, Meet the Composer, and numerous American theaters, including Theater J, the San Diego Repertory Theatre, and Traveling Jewish Theater.

See also

References

Year of birth missing (living people)
Living people
21st-century American composers
21st-century American violinists
American film producers
Klezmer musicians
Manhattan School of Music alumni
People from La Habra, California
Israeli violinists
Israeli film producers